Ian Masters may refer to:

Ian Masters (journalist), Australian-born American journalist; host of radio programs, Background Briefing, and Live From the Left Coast
Ian Masters (songwriter) (born 1964), British producer and songwriter; former member of English indie pop band Pale Saints
Ian Masters (broadcaster), British television broadcaster, commentator, author, screenwriter and documentary filmmaker